Wang Huei-mei (born 22 November 1968) is a Taiwanese politician. She is the incumbent Magistrate of Changhua County since 25 December 2018.

Education
Wang obtained her bachelor's and master's degree in political science from Tunghai University. She is currently pursuing her doctoral degree in finance from National Changhua University of Education.

Early careers
Wang used to be a teacher for junior high schools and vocational high school, as well as a community college principal. She is also an adjunct lecturer at Chienkuo Technology University and Dayeh University.

Political career
Wang was the member of the 13th, 14th and 15th Changhua County Council. She was also the mayor of Lukang Township.

Changhua County magistracy

References

External links
 

1968 births
Living people
Kuomintang Members of the Legislative Yuan in Taiwan
Members of the 8th Legislative Yuan
Members of the 9th Legislative Yuan
Changhua County Members of the Legislative Yuan
Tunghai University alumni
21st-century Taiwanese women politicians
20th-century Taiwanese women politicians
Women mayors of places in Taiwan
Mayors of places in Taiwan